Mi marido y mi novio is a 1955 Argentine film directed by Carlos Schlieper, starring Delia Garcés and Georges Rivière.

Cast
Delia Garcés
Georges Rivière
Luis Dávila
Héctor Calcaño
Nélida Romero
Paulette Christian
Irma Roy
Carmen Campoy
Víctor Martucci
Perla Achával
Alicia Bellán

References

External links
 

1955 films
1950s Spanish-language films
Argentine black-and-white films
Films based on works by Georges Feydeau
Films based on works by Victorien Sardou
Films directed by Carlos Schlieper
1950s Argentine films